The Forty Foot or Forty Foot Drain is a name given to several of the principal channels in the drainage schemes of the Fens of Eastern England, the name being qualified when there is a need to distinguish between them. They are Vermuyden's Drain, South Forty Foot and North Forty Foot.

The Forty Foot Drain in Cambridgeshire

The Forty Foot Drain, also known as Vermuyden's Drain, is an artificial drainage river in Cambridgeshire, which is one of the key elements in draining the Middle Level of the Bedford Level, in the Cambridgeshire part of the Fens. It was instrumental in Sir Cornelius Vermuyden's great drainage scheme of 1649–1653. Located near Chatteris and Ramsey, the river runs , from Wells Bridge, where it joins the old River Nene, to Welches Dam Sluice, where it joins the Counter Wash Drain, which then changes identity, becoming the Old Bedford River. These junctions are at grid references  and  respectively. When the drain was newly made, its western end was in Huntingdonshire. The waters of the Forty Foot Drain no longer discharge through Welches Dam Sluice. Instead they flow via the Sixteen Foot Drain to Three Holes and thence via the Middle Level Main Drain and the pumping station at Wiggenhall St Germans to the sea. The Sixteen Foot Drain connects to the Forty Foot drain above Horseway Lock.

Forty Foot Drains in Lincolnshire
The main land drain in Holland Fen (as distinct from the River Witham, which is designed to carry water past the fens without being part of them) is known as the North Forty Foot Drain. That of the Black Sluice fens is the South Forty-Foot Drain. The latter flows, with some pump assistance, from Bourne North Fen, close to the River Glen, to the Haven at Boston. The North Forty Foot joins the South Forty Foot in the western outskirts of Boston and together their waters enter the Haven through the Black Sluice.

North Forty Foot Drain
According to Wheeler:

Also called Lodowick's Drain. A drain in Holland Fen, running parallel with the Witham, and extending from Chapel Hill to the South Forty Foot at Boston. Formerly emptied into the Witham at Lodowick's or Trinity Gowt." "Lodowick' or Lodovick's Gowt. Was also called Trinity Gowt.

The drain gives its name to the village of North Forty Foot Bank.

South Forty Foot Drain

The main drain in the Black Sluice District, extending from Boston Haven to Gutheram Cote (sc. modern Guthram Gowt). This drain was first cut by the Adventurers who drained the Lindsey Level in the middle of the 17th century. It was afterwards opened out and improved under the Black Sluice Drainage and Navigation Act 1765.

The present sluice was erected under the Black Sluice Drainage Act 1846 and has three openings of a total waterway of sixty feet.

See also

 Cornelius Vermuyden

References

Rivers of Cambridgeshire
Rivers of Lincolnshire
Drainage canals in England
Fenland District
Canals in Lincolnshire
Canals in Cambridgeshire
Canals opened in 1653
1653 establishments in England